The Punjab National Bank Fraud Case relates to fraudulent letter of undertaking worth  (US$1.4 billion) issued by the Punjab National Bank at its Brady House branch in Fort, Mumbai; making Punjab National Bank liable for the amount. The fraud was allegedly organized by jeweller and designer Nirav Modi. Nirav, his wife Ami Modi, brother Nishal Modi and uncle Mehul Choksi, all partners of the firms, M/s Diamond R US, M/s Solar Exports and M/s Stellar Diamonds; along with PNB officials and employees, and directors of Nirav Modi and Mehul Choksi's firms have all been named in a charge sheet by the CBI. Nirav Modi and his family absconded in early 2018, days before the news of the scam broke in India.

India's Enforcement Directorate has begun attaching assets of the accused and is seeking to immediate confiscation under the Fugitive Economic Offenders Ordinance. Nirav is on the Interpol's wanted list for criminal conspiracy, criminal breach of trust, cheating and dishonesty including delivery of property, corruption, money laundering since February 2018.  In March 2019, Nirav was arrested in central London by UK authorities.

The bank initially said that two of its employees at the branch were involved in the scam, as the bank's core banking system was bypassed when the corrupt employees issued LOUs to overseas branches of other Indian banks, including Allahabad Bank, Axis Bank, and Union Bank of India, using the international financial communication system, SWIFT. The transactions were noticed by a new employee of the bank. The bank then complained to the CBI, who is currently investigating the scam apart from ED and Reserve Bank of India. On a later date, CBI named key officials Usha Ananthasubramanian, former CEO of PNB, executive directors KV Brahmaji Rao and Sanjiv Sharan in a chargesheet holding them responsible for failure to implement several circular and caution notices issued by the RBI regarding the reconciliation of SWIFT messages and core banking systems.

Investigation

Punjab National Bank (PNB) alleges associates of three firms - Diamond R US, M/s Solar Exports and M/s Stellar Diamonds- approached PNB on 16 January 2018, with a request for LoUs to make payment to its overseas suppliers. The bank demanded at least a 100 percent cash margin for issuing LoUs, but the firms contested that they had received LoUs without any such guarantee in the past. Branch records did not show any such facility having been granted to the firms, PNB suspected fraud and began digging into transaction history.
On 29 January 2018, PNB filed a complaint with the CBI, wherein it was alleged that Nirav, Ami Modi, Nishal Modi and Mehul Choksi, all partners of M/s Diamond R US, M/s Solar Exports and M/s Stellar Diamonds, in collusion with two bank officials committed the offence of cheating against PNB and caused a wrongful loss. The PNB official in his complaint informed the agency that at the Bank's branch office at Brady House in Fort, Mumbai, two of its employees, Gokulnath Shetty, retired Deputy Manager of PNB and another bank official, issued fraudulent LoUs to Hong Kong based creditors on behalf of three firms associated with Nirav Modi and the Gitanjali Group. “The public servants committed abuse of official position to cause pecuniary advantage to Diamonds R US, Solar Exports and Stellar Diamonds and wrongful loss of Rs 280.70 crore to PNB during 2017,” said the first information report (FIR) filed by CBI.

As of 18 May 2018, the scam has ballooned  (US$2.1 billion) and Nirav Modi is said to be hiding in London, allegedly travelling on a fake passport.

On 13 June 2018, the CBI approached the Interpol to issue a red corner notice (RCN) against Nirav Modi's brother Nishal and one of his executives in connection with its probe into the Punjab National Bank (PNB) fraud. The CBI sent a request to the Interpol to issue a RCN against Nirav Modi and his uncle Mehul Choksi of the Gitanjali Group.

On 20 August 2018, former MD and CEO of Allahabad Bank, Usha Ananthasubramanian was granted bail on a surety bond of Rs 1 lakhs by Special CBI court in Mumbai. A week earlier, the government had dismissed Usha on the last day of her work. Ananthasubramanian was MD of Punjab National Bank between August 2015 and May 2017 and had also served as its executive director. She was dismissed with immediate effect.

The CBI registered a disproportionate assets case against a retired deputy manager of Punjab National Bank, Gokulnath Shetty, a key accused, for allegedly amassing wealth 200 per cent more than his known sources of income.

Nirav Modi, who disappeared in February 2018, was in the British capital since June 2018. He was arrested in central London on 19 March 2019 after an Indian-origin clerk at a bank in central London recognized him and alerted the police. UK police arrested Modi, on behalf of the Indian authorities, who asked for his extradition. Modi appeared in court on 20 March 2019. In the same month, the UK court refused twice to grant him bail on the ground that he was a flight risk and could flee the country if given a chance. For the third time again, Modi was denied bail and to remain in prison till May 24, 2019. The court had also noted that Modi could tamper with evidence if left free. It has revealed in earlier hearings that Modi had threatened to kill a prime witness and bribe another to escape justice. In June 2019, Four Swiss bank accounts of Nirav Modi and his sister Purvi Mehta's had been "frozen" by authorities in Switzerland as part of the Scam, The total amount of Rs 283.16 crore has been frozen on the request of the Enforcement Directorate. After Swiss bank, a few days later, on 2 July 2019, the Singapore High Court ordered to freeze four bank accounts in the name of Modi, Purvi, and her husband, Mayank Mehta. These accounts have Rs 44 crore between them. Interpol has issued Red Corner Notice against both Purvi and Mayank.

In August 2019, The Central Bureau of Investigation (CBI) has moved an application in the special CBI court, seeking to declare fugitive businessman Nirav Modi, his brother Neeshal Modi and a close associate Subhash Parab proclaimed offenders and to attach their properties. All three declared 'wanted' by the CBI in its charge sheet in the Rs 13,700 crore PNB scam. Though the agency last year obtained warrants against them, they couldn't execute as the accused fled India before the case registered in February.

Nirav Modi's legal team has made four bail applications, which have been rejected each time due to Modi deemed a flight risk. Modi, who is prisoned at Wandsworth prison in south-west London since March 2019 which extended till September 19 and later further remanded to judicial custody until October 17 by a UK court which said it was working towards his Five-day extradition trial hearing for May 11–15, 2020 and he must appear via video link before a court every 28 days.

In September 2019, Antigua and Barbuda Prime Minister Gaston Browne said Fugitive diamantaire Mehul Choksi of the Gitanjali Group is a "crook" and repatriated to India after he exhausts all legal options. Mehul Choksi, who is currently in the Caribbean nation of Antigua, told the high court that he left India for medical treatment and not to avoid prosecution in the case. He said he would return to India as soon as he is medically fit to travel.

In December 2019,  Nirav Modi, his step-brother Nehal Modi and two of their business associates tried to threaten witnesses and destroy evidence, said the Central Bureau of Investigation (CBI) in the additional charge sheet submitted before the CBI court in Mumbai. According to CBI's charge-sheet, the evidence came after nine of Nirav's employees submitted details to CBI of how Nirav and Nehal, along with associates, took them to Egypt against their will and coerced them into signing documents that would establish the nine as owners of dummy companies Nirav had floated.

In March 2020, Enforcement Directorate (ED) auctioned 72 luxury items seized from Nirav Modi for Rs 2.29 crore.

In May 2020, Based on the request from Indian agencies, Interpol had put Nehal Modi back again on the Red Corner Notice for assisting his step-brother Nirav Modi in defrauding the PNB months. Last year his name was removed from the Interpol website when Nehal Modi and Neeshal Modi had challenged the RCN. CBI reported, Nehal purportedly managed two companies for Nirav Modi, which received $50 million from dummy entities. After the scam got exposed, he took away diamonds worth $6 million, 3.5 million in UAE dirham, and 50 kg of gold. In Dubai, he destroyed digital evidence in the form of mobile phones and a server, and also threatened the key witnesses.

On 8 June 2020, The Prevention of Money Laundering Act (PMLA) Court has ordered a confiscated of nearly Rs 1,400 crores worth property of Nirav Modi.

In May 2020, the UK court adjourned the Nirav Modi trial until September 2020, on the Five-day extradition trial hearing. Modi has applied for political asylum after his bail was denied five times in the UK.

In July 2020, Enforcement Directorate (ED) has filed a charge sheet against Mehul Choksi alleging how he ran an organized racket to cheat customers and lenders in India, Dubai and the United States.

Reforms
On 1 March 2018, the government approved the Fugitive Economic Offenders Bill to deter economic offenders from evading the process of Indian law by giving powers to the government to confiscate assets of a fugitive, including Benami assets of absconding loan defaulters. The bill covers a wide range of economic offenders which include: loan defaulters, fraudsters, individuals who violate laws governing taxes, black money, Benami properties, financial sector, and corruption. On 12 March 2018, the government introduced the bill in the Lok Sabha.

In March 2018, the Reserve Bank of India scrapped banking instruments such as the Letter of understanding (Lou) and Letter of Comfort (LoC) that in an attempt to plug a loophole and improve banks’ due diligence in trade credit. Some bankers said that Lou's and LoCs led to receiving banks depending completely on the issuing bank on creditworthiness.

See also

References 

Banking in India
Finance fraud
Fraud in India
Punjab National Bank
Gitanjali Group